David Hutchinson may refer to:

 Dave Hutchinson (born 1960), English science fiction writer
 David Hutchinson (producer) (born 1988), British theatre producer and director
 David Hutchinson (referee), British football referee
 David Hutchinson (physicist) (born 1969), quantum physicist and professor

See also
 Dave Hutchison (disambiguation)
 David Hutcheson (1905–1976), British actor